Anizo Correia (born 23 May 2003 in Motaulun, Timor-Leste) is a Timorese association footballer currently playing for Ponta Leste of the Primeira Divisão, and the Timor-Leste national team.

Club career
Correia played with Liquiçá FC of the Segunda Divisão through 2018 when he moved to league rivals FC Lero. The following year he joined AS Ponta Leste of the Primeira Divisão.

International career
In October 2021, Correia represented Timor-Leste in 2022 AFC U-23 Asian Cup qualification. He made two appearances for the team during the Group Stage. Two months later, on 14 December 2021, he went on to make his senior international debut in a 2020 AFF Championship match against Singapore.

International career statistics

References

External links
 
 
 

2003 births
Living people
East Timorese footballers
Timor-Leste international footballers
People from Liquiçá District
Association football forwards
Competitors at the 2021 Southeast Asian Games
Southeast Asian Games competitors for East Timor